Adam Wiktor Szelągowski (23 December 1873 in Lublin – 3 August 1961 in Warsaw) was a Polish historian, teacher and professor of the Jan Kazimierz University.

Szelągowski was a member of the National League.

Works 
 Najstarsze drogi z Polski na Wschód: w okresie bizantyńsko-arabskim, Kraków 1909.
 Dzieje powszechne i cywilizacyi. Vol. I. Egipt. Babilon i Assyrya. Syrya i Palestyna. Azya Mniejsza. Iran i Turan. Indye, Chiny i Pacyfik. Warszawa 1913.
 Dzieje powszechne i cywilizacyi. Vol. II. Grecya archaiczna. Grecya bohaterska. Grecya wolna. Panowanie Grecyi nad światem. Warszawa 1914.
 Dzieje powszechne i cywilizacyi. Vol. III. Rzym – miasto. Rzym – państwo. Impreyalizm rzymski. Cezaryzm. Warszawa 1914.
 Dzieje powszechne i cywilizacyi. Vol. IV. Odrodzenie Wschodu. Geneza społeczeństw na Zachodzie. Świat Turko-słowiański. Warszawa 1918.
 Walka o Bałtyk. Sprawa północna w XVI i XVII. Part I. Lwów 1904.
 Śląsk i Polska wobec powstania czeskiego. Sprawa północna. Part II. Lwów 1904.
 O ujście Wisły. Wielka wojna pruska. Sprawa północna. Part III. Warszawa 1905.
 Chłopi-dziedzice we wsiach na prawie polskiem do końca XII w. (Studya nad historyą prawa polskiego, ed. O. Balzer, Vol. I). Lwów 1899.
 Kwestya ruska w świetle historyi. Part I. Historyczne prawo polskie na Rusi. Part II. Historyczne podstawy kwestyi ruskiej na ziemiach polskich. Warszawa 1911.
 Wici i Topory. Studyum nad genezą i znaczeniem godeł polskich i zawołań. Kraków 1914.
 O socyologicznym traktowaniu dziejów. Lwów 1898.
 Paweł Piasecki, historyk polski XVII w. Part I. Życiorys i charakterystyka ogólna pisarza. Lwów 1899.
 Wschód i Zachód. Zagadnienia z dziejów cywilizacyi. Lwów 1912.
 Pieniądz i przewrót cen w Polsce w XVI i XVII ww. Lwów 1902.
 Rozwój ekonomiczny i społeczny w Polsce do r. 1907 (Polska, Obrazy opisy). Macierz Polska. Lwów 1907.
 Z dziejów współzawodnictwa Anglii i Niemiec, Rosyi i Polski. Lwów 1910.
 The eastland company in Prussia. (The royal historical transactions). Cambridge University Press 1912.
 Układy królewicza Władysława i dysydentów z Gustawem Adolfem. Lwów 1900.
 Rozkład Rzeszy i Polska za Władysława IV. Kraków 1907.
 Sprawa reformy elekcyi za panowania Zygmunta III. Lwów 1912.

References

Bibliography 

1873 births
1961 deaths
Writers from Lublin
People from Lublin Governorate
National League (Poland) members
20th-century Polish historians
Polish male non-fiction writers
Academic staff of the University of Lviv
Burials at Powązki Cemetery